Two ships of the Imperial Japanese Navy were named Hōshō:

 , a screw sloop launched in 1868 and scrapped in 1907
 , an aircraft carrier launched in 1921 and scrapped in 1946

Imperial Japanese Navy ship names
Japanese Navy ship names